Princess Dorothea of Saxony (7 January 1591 - 17 November 1617) reigned as Princess-Abbess of Quedlinburg from 1610 until her death.

Dorothea was born in Dresden to Christian I, Elector of Saxony, and his wife, Princess Sophie of Brandenburg. Her baptism was notably held without the customary exorcism.

Reign 

On 18 April 1610, Dorothea was elected successor of Princess-Abbess Maria of Quedlinburg. Vogt and patron of the abbey-principality at the time was Dorothea's brother, Christian II, Elector of Saxony. Emperor Rudolf II confirmed her election on 19 July.

Dorothea's relatively short reign was uneventful. She granted additional rights to the town of Quedlinburg and raised the income of preachers and teachers.

The 26-year-old Princess-Abbess died suddenly in Dresden during a visit to her brother. She was buried in Freiberg. As she had not selected her coadjutrix, the chapter elected Duchess Dorothea Sophia of Saxe-Altenburg.

Abbesses of Quedlinburg
House of Wettin
1591 births
1617 deaths
Nobility from Dresden
Lutheran abbesses
Albertine branch
Burials at Freiberg Cathedral
Daughters of monarchs